James Seabrook Everett (20 July 1884 – 19 June 1968) was an Australian rules footballer who played with West Perth in the West Australian Football League (WAFL).

Family 
The son of George James Everett (1842–1915), and Martha Susannah Everett (1853–1935), née Doust, James Seabrook Everett was born in Toodyay, Western Australia on 20 July 1884.

He married Agnes Florence Gardiner Robertson (1884–) on 17 May 1913.

Football
Recruited from the Junior team, Perth Central, Everett made his Western Australian Football Association (WAFA) debut in 1901, at the age of 17.
FOOTBALL.

He was a member of West Perth's 1905 premiership team, won through a grand final replay, as a centre-half back. In the drawn grand final, Everett had played on a half forward flank.

He was the vice-captain of the West Australian team at the 1908 Melbourne Carnival.

He played his last WAFL game with West Perth in 1915—the WAFA competition had been renamed Western Australian Football League (WAFL) in 1908—before enlisting with the First AIF in October 1915.

Cricket
The first Western Australian to represent his state in both cricket and football, he played his one and only first-class match for the Western Australian cricket team in the 1909/10 season.

The fixture, which took place at the WACA, was played against Victoria. Everett was in the side as a right-arm fast-medium bowler but couldn't take a wicket, finishing with figures of 0/48 off 13 overs in the only innings Western Australia bowled. With the bat he was required twice, coming in at eight in the batting order. He was dismissed by Arthur Kenny in both innings, for 13 and 0.

Military service
Everett enlisted in the First AIF on 6 October 1915, and he served with the 44th Battalion and fought on the Western Front.

Wounded in action on 10 August 1918, he suffered gunshot wounds to his leg and shoulder, and was evacuated to England, where he recovered from his wounds and left England, for Australia, on HMAS Karoola on 13 December 1918, arriving home in January 1919.

See also
 1908 Melbourne Carnival

Footnotes

References
 World War One Service Record: Lieutenant James Seabrook Everett (229), National Archives of Australia.
 World War One Embarkation Roll: Company Sergeant Major Warrant Officer Class 2 James Seabrook Everett (229), Australian War Memorial.
 World War One Embarkation Roll: Lieutenant James Seabrook Everett (229), Australian War Memorial.
 Australian Imperial Force: Appointments, Promotions, etc.: Infantry: 44th Battalion: To be 2nd Lieutenants: Company Sergeant-Major James Seabrook Everett, Commonwealth of Australia Gazette,  No.6, (Tuesday, 18 January 1917), p.69. (Effective date of promotion: 9 September 1916.)
 Greg Wardell-Johnson, "WESTERN AUSTRALIAN INTERSTATE FOOTBALL REPRESENTATIVES 1904–2013".

External links

1884 births
1968 deaths
Australian rules footballers from Western Australia
West Perth Football Club players
Australian cricketers
People from Toodyay, Western Australia
Western Australia cricketers
Australian military personnel of World War I
Cricketers from Western Australia